is a combination of a zoo and an amusement park located in Miyashiro, Saitama Prefecture, Japan.

Grape-kun
Grape-kun was a 21-year-old Humboldt penguin at the zoo. His attachment to an anime cutout of a character from Kemono Friends earned him international fame. The zoo announced his death on 12 October 2017.

Rocky-kun
In promoting the 2018 movie Bungo Stray Dogs: Dead Apple, Tobu Zoo a pictures of weretiger character Atsushi Nakajima alongside white tiger known as "Rocky-kun". During the promotion of this event, Atsushi's voice actor, Yūto Uemura, collaborated in making multiple announcement which was run between February 24 and March 3, 2018.

Roller coasters
Kawasemi
Tentomushi
Diggy & Daggy's Tram Coaster

See also
 Animal theme park

References

External links
 http://www.tobuzoo.com/global/english/

Animal theme parks
Buildings and structures in Saitama Prefecture
Tourist attractions in Saitama Prefecture
Zoos in Japan
1981 establishments in Japan
Zoos established in 1981
Amusement parks in Japan
Water parks in Japan
Miyashiro, Saitama
Tobu Railway